(born Saitama, 13 January 1976) is a Japanese rugby union player with 20 international caps and 15 points in aggregate. He played as flanker and as number 8.

Career
Kubo started his rugby career in high school, playing for Yorii High School team until his graduation in 1994, when he joined the Daito Bunka University team until 1998, when he graduated to play for Yamaha Júbilo, where he would play for his professional career until his retirement in 2009. In 2001, Kubo was appointed as captain of Yamaha Júbilo. Kubo also played in the Kansai representative team.

International career
Kubo was first capped for the Japan national team on 11 November 2000, during the test match against Ireland, at Lansdowne Road. He also was called up in the Japanese roster for the Rugby World Cup 2003 in Australia, playing two matches in the tournament. His last international cap was on 4 July 2004, during the test match against Italy, in Tokyo.

Personal life
Kubo is a great fan of Southern All Stars.

References

External links
Koichi Kubo international stats
Koichi Kubo profile at Top League

1976 births
Sportspeople from Saitama Prefecture
Living people
Japanese rugby union players
Shizuoka Blue Revs players
Japan international rugby union players
Rugby union flankers
Rugby union number eights
Asian Games medalists in rugby union
Rugby union players at the 2002 Asian Games
Asian Games silver medalists for Japan
Medalists at the 2002 Asian Games